Lashkari may refer to:

People

Lashkari is a Persian name; people with this name include:

 Lashkari ibn Muhammad, Shaddadid ruler of Ganja (971–78)
 Lashkari ibn Musa, Shaddadid ruler of Arran (1034–49)
 Muhammad Shah III Lashkari, Bahmani sultan (1463–1482)

Places

 Lashkari, Dahanu, a village in Maharashtra, India

Languages
 The language Lashkari, known more commonly by its Chagatai derived given name Urdu

Other

 Lashkari (racehorse) (1981–96)

See also
 Lascari, town in Sicily, Italy
 Lascar (disambiguation)
 Lashkar (disambiguation)